Taman U-Thant is a place in Kuala Lumpur, Malaysia. Located in the eastern part of the city, it was established in the 1960s and was used for foreign embassies and high commissions only. It was named after the former UN General Secretary from 1961 until 1971, U Thant.

See also
 List of Kuala Lumpur embassies

Suburbs in Kuala Lumpur